Bernard Adamus (born December 16, 1977) is a Canadian singer-songwriter based in Quebec, whose music draws on folk, blues, country and hip-hop influences.

Biography 
Adamus immigrated to Quebec with his family at the age of three, and was raised in Montreal.

In 2009, Adamus released his debut album Brun on Grosse Boîte. The album was supported by the singles "La question à 100 piasses" and "Brun (la couleur de l'amour)". He won several awards at that year's Festival en chanson de Petite-Vallée, including the Artisti award for best performance and the Prix de la guitare Boucher. He won the 2009 Echo Songwriting Prize (French) for "La question à 100 piasses", and in 2010 he was named winner of that year's Francouvertes festival. The album was a shortlisted nominee for Folk Album of the Year at the 2010 Félix Awards, and Adamus won the award for Découverte de l'année (Best New Artist).

A non-album single, "Rue Ontario", was released in 2010, featuring both a live recording of the song and a remix by electronic artist Marie-Hélène "MHMHMH" Delorme.

In 2011 he won the Prix Félix-Leclerc at the FrancoFolies de Montréal, and his album Brun was a shortlisted nominee for the Juno Award for Francophone Album of the Year at the Juno Awards of 2011 against Karkwa's winning album Les Chemins de verre.

He followed up with his second album, N° 2, in 2012. The album was a nominee for Folk Album of the Year at the 2013 Félix Awards, losing to Les sœurs Boulay's Le poids des confettis. Voters in CBC Radio 3's year-end Bucky Awards for 2012 also named Adamus winner of the "Best Reason to Learn French" award.

Sexual assault 
In July 2020, Bernard Adamus was accused of committing several inappropriate gestures. On social media, several people shared rumours that Adamus committed sexual assault. Following these allegations, his record label Dare to Care, ended their professional relationship. Adamus did not deny the allegations, and apologized for his behaviour.

Discography 
 Brun (2009)
 N° 2 (2012)
 Sorel Soviet So What (2015)
 C'qui nous reste du Texas (2019)

References

External links 
 

1977 births
Canadian male singer-songwriters
Canadian country singer-songwriters
Canadian country guitarists
Canadian male guitarists
Polish emigrants to Canada
People from Mercier–Hochelaga-Maisonneuve
Singers from Montreal
Living people
Canadian blues singers
Canadian blues guitarists
Canadian folk singer-songwriters
Canadian folk guitarists
French-language singers of Canada
21st-century Canadian guitarists
21st-century Canadian male singers
Canadian Folk Music Award winners